The 2008 Danish Figure Skating Championships was held at the Gladsaxe Skøjtehal in Gladsaxe from November 30 through December 2, 2007. Skaters competed in the disciplines of men's singles, ladies' singles, and ice dancing on the levels of senior, junior, novice, and the pre-novice levels of debs, springs, and cubs. Not all disciplines were held on all levels due to a lack of participants.

The junior compulsory dance was the Blues. The first novice compulsory dance was the Rocker Foxtrot and the second was the European Waltz.

Senior results

Men

Ladies

Junior results

Men

Ladies

 WD = Withdrawn

Ice dancing

Novice results

Boys

Girls

Ice dancing

Pre-novice results

Debs boys

 WD = Withdrawn

Debs girls

Springs girls

 WD = Withdrawn

Cubs boys

Cubs girls

External links
 2008 Danish Championships results
 Dansk Skøjte Union

Danish Figure Skating Championships
2007 in figure skating
Figure Skating Championships